Alphonse Antonio de Sarasa was a Jesuit mathematician who contributed to the understanding of logarithms, particularly as areas under a hyperbola.

Alphonse de Sarasa was born in 1618, in Nieuwpoort in Flanders. In 1632 he was admitted as a novice in Ghent. It was there that he worked alongside Gregoire de Saint-Vincent whose ideas he developed, exploited, and promulgated. According to Sommervogel, Alphonse de Sarasa also held academic positions in Antwerp and Brussels.

In 1649 Alphonse de Sarasa published Solutio problematis a R.P. Marino Mersenne Minimo propositi. This book was in response to Marin Mersenne's pamphlet "Reflexiones Physico-mathematicae" which reviewed Saint-Vincent's Opus Geometricum and posed this challenge:
 Given three arbitrary magnitudes, rational or irrational, and given the logarithms of the two, to find the logarithm of the third geometrically.

R.P. Burn explains that the term logarithm was used differently in the seventeenth century. Logarithms were any arithmetic progression which corresponded to a geometric progression.  Burn says, in reviewing de Sarasa's popularization of de Saint-Vincent, and concurring with Moritz Cantor, that "the relationship between logarithms and the hyperbola was found by Saint-Vincent in all but name".

Burn quotes de Sarasa on this point: "…the foundation of the teaching embracing logarithms are contained" in Saint-Vincent's Opus Geometricum, part 4 of Book 6, de Hyperbola.

Alphonse Antonio de Sarasa died in Brussels in 1667.

Works

See also
List of Roman Catholic scientist-clerics

References

Jesuits of the Spanish Netherlands
1618 births
1667 deaths
Mathematicians of the Spanish Netherlands
Logarithms
People from Nieuwpoort, Belgium
Jesuit scientists